What It Takes may refer to:

 What It Takes (film), a documentary about Ironman triathletes
 "What It Takes" (Aerosmith song), 1989
 "What It Takes" (Adam Gregory song), 2008
 What It Takes (EP), a 1997 EP by Choclair
 What It Takes (album), a 2009 album by The Sleeping
What It Takes: The Way to the White House, a 1992 book by Richard Ben Cramer
 "What It Takes" (Succession), a 2021 episode of TV series Succession